On 21 July 1944, United States Marine and Army forces invaded the island of Guam, the southernmost of the Mariana Islands chain in the Central Pacific, with the intent to take control of the island from the Imperial Japanese Army. Operation Forager II, as it was called by American planners, was a phase of the Pacific Theatre of World War II. 

The Guam landings had been tentatively set for 18 June but a large Japanese carrier attack and stubborn resistance by the unexpectedly large Japanese garrison on Saipan led to the invasion of Guam being postponed for a month. 

The island was declared secure on 10 August 1944.

US Command Structure

Naval 
The roles of Commander in Chief, Pacific Ocean Areas (CINCPOA) and Commander in Chief, U.S. Pacific Fleet (CINCPAC), were both exercised by Admiral Chester W. Nimitz from his headquarters at Pearl Harbor, Hawaii.

Since the Marianas lie in the Central Pacific, their capture was the responsibility of the U.S. Fifth Fleet, led by Vice Admiral Raymond A. Spruance from aboard his flagship, heavy cruiser Indianapolis.

The ships and embarked troops of both Operation Forager I, for the Central Marianas (Saipan and Tinian) and Forager II, for the Southern Marianas (Guam), were under the overall command of Rear Admiral Richmond Kelly Turner aboard amphibious command ship Rocky Mount.

The ships and embarked troops for the Guam portion of Operation Forager were under the direct operational command of Rear Admiral Richard L. Conolly.

Ground Troops 
The Marine and Army landing forces for both the Central and Southern Marianas phases of Operation Forager were under the overall command of Maj. Gen. Holland M. "Howlin' Mad" Smith, USMC. 

III Marine Amphibious Corps (Maj. Gen. Roy S. Geiger, USMC)
 Northern landing area: 3rd Marine Division (Maj. Gen. Allen H. Turnage, USMC)
 Southern landing area: 1st Provisional Marine Brigade (Brig. Gen. Lemuel C. Shepherd Jr., USMC)
 Reserve: 77th Infantry ("Statue of Liberty") Division (Army) (Maj. Gen. Andrew D. Bruce, USA)

US Forces

Expeditionary Troops (Task Force 56)
Lieutenant General Holland M. Smith
 Chief of Staff: Brig. Gen. Graves B. Erskine
 Personnel Officer (G-1): Lt. Col. Albert F. Metze
 Intelligence Officer (G-2): Col. St. Julien R. Marshall
 Operations Officer (G-3): Col. John C. McQueen
 Logistics Officer (G-4): Col. Raymond E. Knapp
 Plans Officer (G-5): Col. Joseph T. Smith
 Northern Troops and Landing Force (Task Group 56.1 – Saipan and Tinian)
 Consisting of V Amphibious Corps
 
 Southern Troops and Landing Force (Task Group 56.2 – Guam)
 Consisting of III Amphibious Corps

 III Marine Amphibious Corps
Major General Roy S. Geiger
 Chief of Staff: Brig. Gen. Merwin H. Silverthorn
 Personnel Officer (C-1):	Col. William J. Scheyer
 Intelligence Officer (C-2): 	Lt. Col. William F. Coleman
 Operations Officer (C-3): 	Col. Walter A. Wachtler
 Logistics Officer (C-4): Lt. Col. Frederick L. Wieseman

 III Marine Amphibious Corps Artillery
 Brigadier General Pedro del Valle
 Chief of Staff :	Col. John A. Bemis
 Personnel Officer (A-1): Maj. James A. Tatsch
 Intelligence Officer (A-2): Warrant Officer David G. Garnett
 Operations Officer (A-3): Lt. Col. Frederick P. Henderson
 Logistics Officer (A-4): Maj. Frederick W. Miller
 1st 155mm Howitzer Battalion
 Commanding Officer: Col. James J. Keating
 Executive Officer: 	Maj. George H. Ford
 Operations Officer (Bn-3): Maj. Marshall J. Hooper
 2nd 155mm Howitzer Battalion
 Commanding Officer: 	Lt. Col. Marvin H. Floom
 Executive Officer: 	Maj. Gene N. Schraeder
 Operations Officer (Bn-3):	Maj. Earl J. Fowse

Northern landing area (West of Agana) 

  3rd Marine Division (20,338 officers and enlisted)
 Major General Allen H. Turnage
 Asst. Div. Cmdr.:	Brigadier General Alfred H. Noble
 Chief of Staff: Col. Ray A. Robinson
 Personnel Officer (D-1): Lt. Col. Chevey S. White, Maj. Irving R. Kriendler
 Intelligence Officer (D-2): Lt. Col. Howard J. Turton (to 28 Jul), Lt. Col. Ellsworth N. Murray
 Operations Officer (D-3): Col. James A. Stuart (to 28 Jul), Lt. Col. Howard J. Turton 
 Logistics Officer (D-4): Lt. Col. Ellsworth N. Murray (to 28 Jul), Col. William C. Hall 

 Left Sector (Red Beaches):
  3rd Marine Regiment
 Colonel William C. Hall (to 28 Jul), Colonel James A. Stuart
 Exec. Ofc.: Col. James D. Snedeker
 1st Battalion
 CO: Maj. Henry Aplington, II
 XO: Maj. John A. Ptak
 2nd Battalion 
 CO: Lt. Col. Hector de Zayas, Maj. William A. Culpepper
 XO: Maj. William A. Culpepper (to 26 Jul), Maj. Howard J. Smith
 3rd Battalion 
 CO: Lt. Col. Ralph L. Houser (WIA 22 Jul), Maj. Royal R. Bastian 
 XO: Maj. Royal R. Bastian (to 23 Jul), Capt. William R. Bradley 

 Center Sector (Green Beach):
  21st Marine Regiment
 Colonel Arthur H. Butler
 Exec. Ofc.: Lt. Col. Ernest W. Fry Jr.
 1st Battalion 
 CO: Lt. Col. Marlowe C. Williams
 XO: Lt. Col. Ronald R. Van Stockum
 2nd Battalion 
 CO: Lt. Col. Eustace R. Smoak
 XO: Maj. Lowell E. English
 3rd Battalion
 CO: Lt. Col. Wendell H. Duplantis
 XO: Maj. Edward A. Clark

 Right Sector (Blue Beaches):
  9th Marine Regiment
 Colonel Edward A. Craig
 Exec. Ofc.: Lt. Col. Jaime Sabater (WIA 21 Jul), Lt. Col. Ralph M. King 
 1st Battalion 
 CO: Lt. Col. Carey A. Randall
 XO: Maj. Harold C. Boehm
 2nd Battalion
 CO: Lt. Col. Robert E. Cushman, Jr.
 XO: Maj. William T. Glass
 3rd Battalion 
 CO: Lt. Col. Walter Asmuth, Jr. (WIA 21 Jul), Maj. Donald B. Hubbard (WIA 1 Aug), Maj. Jess P. Ferrill, Jr.
 XO: Maj. Donald B. Hubbard (to 22 Jul), Capt. Calvin W. Kunz, Jr.

 Landed after W-Day:
  12th Marine Regiment (Artillery)
 Colonel John B. Wilson
 Exec. Ofc.: Lt. Col. John S. Letcher
 1st Battalion
 CO: Lt. Col. Raymond F. Crist Jr. (WIA 22 Jul)
 XO: Maj. George B. Thomas
 2nd Battalion
 CO: Lt. Col. Donald M. Weller
 XO: Mj. Henry E. W. Barnes
 3rd Battalion
 CO: Lt. Col. Alpha L. Bowser
 XO: Maj. Claude S. Sanders, Jr.
 4th Battalion
 CO: Lt. Col. Bernard H. Kirk (WIA 21 Jul)
 XO: Maj. Thomas R. Belzer

  19th Marine Regiment (Engineer)
 Lt. Col. Robert E. Fojt
 Exec. Ofc.: Lt. Col. Edmund M. Williams
 1st Battalion
 CO: Lt. Col. Walter S. Campbell
 XO: Maj. Virgil M. Davis
 2nd Battalion 
 CO: Maj. Victor J. Simpson
 XO: Maj. Howard A. Hurst

 Other units
 3rd Medical Battalion (Cmdr. Raymond R. Callaway, USN)
 3rd Motor Transport Battalion (Lt. Col. Thomas R. Stokes)
 3rd Service Battalion (Lt. Col. Durant S. Buchanan) 
 3rd Tank Battalion (Lt. Col. Hartnoll J. Withers)
 25th Naval Construction Battalion (Lt. Cmdr. George J. Whelan, USN)

Southern landing area (South of Orote Peninsula) 

 Left beaches:
  77th Infantry ("Statue of Liberty") Division (Army) (17,958 officers and enlisted)
 Major General Andrew D. Bruce, USA
 Asst. Div. Cmdr.: Brig. Gen. Edwin H. Randle, USA
 CO, Divisional Artillery: Brig. Gen. Isaac Spalding, USA
 Chief of Staff: 	Col. Douglas C. McNair (KIA 6 August); Lt. Col. Guy V. Miller (from 6 August)
 306th Regimental Combat Team
 307th Regimental Combat Team

 Right beaches:
  1st Provisional Marine Brigade (9,886 officers and enlisted)
 Brigadier General Lemuel C. Shepherd Jr.
 Chief of Staff: 	Col. John T. Walker
 Personnel Officer (B-1): Maj. Addison B. Overstreet
 Intelligence Officer (B-2):	Maj. Robert W. Shaw
 Operations Officer (B-3):	Lt. Col. Thomas A. Culhane, Jr.
 Logistics Officer (B-4): Lt. Col. August Larson

 Northern portion (Yellow Beaches):
  22nd Marine Regiment
 Colonel Merlin F. Schneider
 Exec. Ofc.: Lt. Col. William J. Wise
 1st Battalion
 CO: Lt. Col. Walfried H. Fromhold (to 31 Jul), Maj. Crawford B. Lawton
 XO: Maj. Crawford B. Lawton (to 1 Aug), Maj. William E. Sperling, III 
 2nd Battalion
 CO: Lt. Col. Donn C. Hart (to 27 Jul), Maj. John F. Schoettel (WIA 27 Jul)
 XO: Maj. Robert P. Felker
 3rd Battalion
 CO: Lt. Col. Clair W. Shisler (WIA 27 Jul)
 XO: Maj. Earl J. Cook

 Southern portion (White Beaches):
  4th Marine Regiment
 Lt. Colonel Alan Shapley
 Exec. Ofc.: Lt. Col. Samuel D. Puller (KIA 27 Jul), Capt. Charles T. Lamb
 1st Battalion
 CO: Maj. Bernard W. Green
 XO: Maj. Robert S. Wade (temp. atchd.)
 2nd Battalion
 CO: Maj. John S. Messer
 XO: Maj. Roy S. Batterton, Jr. (WIA 21 Jul), Capt. Lincoln N. Holdzcom 
 3rd Battalion
 CO: Maj. Hamilton M. Hoyler
 XO: Maj. Hugh J. Chapman
 UDTs 3 and 4

 Floating reserve:
 305th Regimental Combat Team (Army) (detached from 77th Inf. Div.)
 Commanding Officer: Col. V.J. Tanzola, USA

 Other units:
 9th Defense Battalion (Lt. Col. Archie E. O'Neil)
 14th Defense Battalion (Lt. Col. William F. Parks)

Guam Island Command 

 Major General Henry L. Larsen
 Chief of Staff: Col. Robert Blake
 Personnel Officer (A-1): Col. Lee N. Utz
 Intelligence Officer (A-2): Col. Francis H. Brink
 Operations Officer (A-3): Col. Benjamin W. Atkinson (to 8 Aug), Lt. Col. Shelton C. Zern
 Logistics Officer (A-4): Col. James A. Mixson
 Plans Officer (A-5): Col. Charles I. Murray
 1st Provisional Base Headquarters Battalion
 Lt. Col. Victor A. Barraco
 Headquarters Company: 	1st Lt. Emerson S. Clark, Jr.
 Military Police Company: Capt. Paul J. Swartz
 5th Field Depot
 Lt. Col. Walter A. Churchill
 Executive Officer: 	Lt. Col. Patrick J. Haltigan, Jr.
 Operations Officer: 	Maj. John W. Allen

Japanese Forces

Overall command
Lt. Gen. Takeshi Takashina
 Thirty-First Army
 Lt. Gen. Hideyoshi Obata
 Approx. 19,000 officers and enlisted
 29th Division (Lt. Gen. Takashina)
 18th Infantry Regiment
 38th Infantry Regiment
 1st Tank Division
 9th Tank Regiment
 48th Independent Brigade
 10th Independent Mixed Regiment
 6th Expeditionary Force
 Maj. Gen. Kiyoshi Shigematsu
 319th, 321st, 322nd, 820th Independent Infantry Battalions

 Navy Land Units
 Navy Air Service

 Additional air defense, engineer, signals, etc., support elements

Notes

References

Bibliography 
 
 
 

World War II orders of battle
World War II operations and battles of the Pacific theatre
United States Marine Corps in World War II
Battles and operations of World War II involving Japan
1944 in Guam